State Highway 12 in Haryana is meant for Karnal-Assandh-Jind-Hansi-Tosham-Sodiwas. The total length of State Highway is of 192.32 km.

See also
List of state highways in Haryana

References

 Haryana PWD Site